Microtragus gazellae is a species of beetle in the family Cerambycidae. It was described by R. Kriesche in 1923.

References

Parmenini
Beetles described in 1923